The 2015–16 season was the Al-Hilal Saudi Football Club's 59th in existence and 40th consecutive season in the top flight of Saudi Arabian football. Along with Pro League, the club also competed in the AFC Champions League, Super Cup, Crown Prince Cup and the King Cup.

Players

Squad information
Players and squad numbers last updated on 23 February 2016.Note: Flags indicate national team as has been defined under FIFA eligibility rules. Players may hold more than one non-FIFA nationality.

Transfers

In

Out

On loan

Pre-season and friendlies

Competitions

Overall

Last Updated: 24 May 2016

Saudi Super Cup

Pro League

League table

Results summary

Results by round

Matches
All times are local, AST (UTC+3).

Crown Prince Cup

Al-Hilal started the tournament directly to the round of 16, as one of last year's finalists. All times were local, AST (UTC+3).

King Cup

All times are local, AST (UTC+3).

2015 AFC Champions League

Knockout stage

Quarter-finals

Semi-finals

2016 AFC Champions League

Group stage

Knockout stage

Round of 16

Statistics

Goalscorers

Last Updated: 24 May 2016

Assists

Last Updated: 8 May 2016

Clean sheets

Last Updated: 24 May 2016

Notes

References

Al Hilal SFC seasons
Al-Hilal